In physics, the line of action (also called line of application) of a force (F) is a geometric representation of how the force is applied. It is the line through the point at which the force is applied in the same direction as the vector .

The concept is essential, for instance, for understanding the net effect of multiple forces applied to a body. For example, if two forces of equal magnitude act upon a rigid body along the same line of action but in opposite directions, they cancel and have no net effect. But if, instead, their lines of action are not identical, but merely parallel, then their effect is to create a moment on the body, which tends to rotate it.

Calculation of torque
For the simple geometry associated with the figure, there are three equivalent equations for the magnitude of the torque associated with a force  directed at displacement  from the axis whenever the force is perpendicular to the axis:

References 

Force